Seoul Broadcasting System (SBS) is one of the leading South Korean television and radio broadcasters. The broadcaster legally became known as SBS in March 2000, changing its corporate name from Seoul Broadcasting System (서울방송). Its flagship terrestrial television station SBS TV broadcasts as channel 6 for digital and cable.

Established on 14 November 1990, SBS is the largest private broadcaster in South Korea, and is owned by the Taeyoung Construction. It operates its flagship television channel which has a nationwide network of 10 regional stations, and three radio networks. SBS has provided digital terrestrial television service in the ATSC format since 2001, and T-DMB (Digital Multimedia Broadcasting) service since 2005.

History 
After the 1987 South Korean democratic reform, the government had decided to create a new commercial broadcaster in South Korea. Eventually, MBC was a mouthpiece of KBS to broadcast sporting events like the 1986 FIFA World Cup, and however, the purpose for South Korea's new commercial broadcaster has to become an alternative channel to the audience that it was before 1990 mastered by MBC. Then, during the separation of MBC from KBS, the government had luckily succeeded it, and by that, it introduced a new South Korean commercial broadcaster called SBS. According to the National Pension Service, SBS is South Korea's second commercial broadcaster after MBC, and it were founded on 14 November 1990, when the government allowed the creation of a second commercial station in Seoul. At the same time, during its establishment, SBS were first marking its start by beginning its experimental demo emissions, and then later, it were therefore commencing its test transmissions for its TV and radio channels on 1 December 1990, that same year. Later, on 20 March 1991, SBS started its regular broadcasts by launching SBS Radio's first regular broadcasts on AM 792kHz. 9 months later, on 1 December 1991, that same year, when MBC celebrated its 30th anniversary, SBS commenced its official broadcasts with the introduction of SBS TV at 10:00am in Seoul, and it was designated as "The Day of Birth of SBS", as it broadcast by MBC on the program MBC Newsdesk. Initially, SBS were only broadcasting terrestrially in Seoul and its surrounding areas. On 9 October 1992, the government began accepting applications for private broadcasting stations in other regions of the country. SBS had planned for a television and radio broadcast affiliate network that aims to air SBS' programs in other new regional channels before its 5th anniversary. In 1994, the private channels KNN in Busan, TJB in Daejeon, TBC in Daegu, and kbc in Gwangju were created after government approval. On 14 May 1995, SBS launched its national television network with its new local affiliates, KNN, TJB, TBC, and kbc. SBS had managed a network that airs SBS programs in other regional channels while local stations created local programming to suit the local residents needs.

In 1996, plans for an FM radio station, which will complement the existing AM station came into fruition. On 14 November 1996, SBS Power FM began broadcasting on 107.7 MHz as a music-centric station. On 4 January 1999, the original SBS Radio on AM 792 kHz began broadcasting on FM as well. The station rebranded as SBS Love FM on 103.5 MHz, simultaneously airing on both AM and FM frequencies. High-definition digital television was introduced in 2001. Digital Multimedia Broadcasting (DMB) was introduced in 2005.

SBS introduced its current logo on 14 November 2000, after its 10th anniversary celebration titled SBS 10th Anniversary Special: Thank You, Viewers to ensure the overall coherence of the current identity. SBS' logo has three embryos placed in a circle of the model where three colors are used to represent the symbol of human-centered, cultural and creative, future-oriented management philosophy, showing that the 'life' and 'the seeds of civilization' has centered on the theme of SBS. SBS' branding is used in all sectors such as vehicle, microphone, envelopes, business cards, memorabilia, helicopter, signs, ganpanryu, seosikryu, uniforms, program title, etc. SBS also had used the slogan "Humanism thru Digital" until January 2010 where a new slogan is currently used. Gomi is the mascot of SBS-oriented as the new face of 'Humanism thru Digital' through the harmony of nature and human life where green environment is important. On 29 October 2012, SBS TV became South Korea's second channel to go 24/7, but it had discontinued in 2017 thus, have reverted to daily sign-off routines during overnights (alongside MBC TV).

The network's current advertising slogan is Together, we make delight (함께 만드는 기쁨), as used in a new station identification video with apl.de.ap's "We Can Be Anything" as background music.

SBS channels 
1 terrestrial TV (SBS TV Channel 6)
3 radio stations

7 cable TV channels (SBS Plus, SBS Golf, SBS funE, SBS Sports, SBS Biz, SBS M, KiZmom)

Holding and subsidiaries

Family companies

SBS Regional

Programming 

SBS dramas have been part of the "Korean wave", exported to many countries across the world. Sandglass has one of the highest viewership ratings in South Korea, and is considered the breakout drama for the network. Other dramas that have enjoyed high viewership include Lovers in Paris, Brilliant Legacy, Rustic Period, Temptation of Wife, The Heirs, and My Love from the Star. SBS airs a variety of entertainment programs ranging from informational, comedy, music, reality, talk shows, and auditions. Many programs are popular throughout Asia, including X-Man, Family Outing, Running Man, Inkigayo, and many more. SBS documentaries encompass a wide range of issues, from foreign affairs to the environment.  (Korean:그것이 알고싶다/literal translation: I Want to know) premiered in 1992, and has since earned notoriety for its investigations from a journalistic standpoint. SBS also broke tradition by creating its flagship newscast SBS Eight O'Clock News, airing at 20:00 instead of 21:00, giving itself the slogan "News an hour earlier". It also produces news-analysis programs such as Morning Wide, Nightline, SBS Current Affairs Debate, Curious Stories Y, and In Depth 21 covering the political, economic, social and cultural issues of the days.

See also 
 Korean Broadcasting System
 Educational Broadcasting System
 Munhwa Broadcasting Corporation

References

External links 
 Official SBS Website 
 Official SBS Global Website
 SBS International (SBS America)

 
Television networks in South Korea
Korean-language television stations
Television channels in South Korea
Mass media companies of South Korea
Television channels and stations established in 1990
Mass media in Seoul
1990 establishments in South Korea
Yangcheon District